The 1972 Boston University Terriers football team was an American football team that represented Boston University as an independent during the 1972 NCAA College Division football season. In their fourth season under head coach Larry Naviaux, the Terriers compiled a 2–8 record and were outscored by a total of 281 to 117.

Schedule

References

Boston University
Boston University Terriers football seasons
Boston University Terriers football